Emamzadeh Khatun (also Romanized as Emāmzādeh Khātūn; also known as Paridar Abolhasan, Parī Dar Abū ol Ḩasan, Parīdar-e Abow hasan, and Parī Dar-e Abū ol Ḩasan) is a village in Kamazan-e Sofla Rural District, Zand District, Malayer County, Hamadan Province, Iran. At the 2006 census, its population was 271, in 71 families.

References 

Populated places in Malayer County